The City of Melville in Perth, Western Australia was originally established on 14 December 1900 as the East Fremantle Road Board with a chairman and councillors under the Roads Boards Act 1871. It was renamed Melville six months later, and with the passage of the Local Government Act 1960, all road boards became Shires with a shire president and councillors effective 1 July 1961. The Shire of Melville was declared a town on 28 September 1962, at which point the president became a mayor. Melville attained city status on 3 May 1968.

Chairmen

Shire presidents

Mayors 

 Known as Katy Mair until 2003.

References

Lists of local government leaders in Western Australia
City of Melville